John Roland Boyd Tobin (born 12 August 1959) is an Australian former rugby league footballer who played for the Eastern Suburbs (Sydney Roosters). His preferred position was at  forward.

Tobin was arrested on 25 December 2016 and charged with importing cocaine through the Sydney Fish Market.

References

External links
Playing statistics

1959 births
Living people
Australian drug traffickers
Australian rugby league players
City New South Wales rugby league team players
Sydney Roosters players
Sydney Roosters captains
Place of birth missing (living people)
Rugby league locks